Kembra may be,

Kembra language
Kembra Pfahler